Hellinsia obscuricilia is a moth of the family Pterophoridae that is found in Venezuela and Costa Rica.

The forewings are light yellowish-brown and the hindwings are somewhat darker with greyish-brown fringes. Adults are on wing in April.

References

Moths described in 2001
obscuricilia
Moths of South America
Moths of Central America